Sabratha wa Surman (Sabratha and Surman) was one of the districts of Libya from 1998 to 2007, in the Northwest.  Since 2007 the area has been part of Zawiya District. 

In the north, Sabratha wa Surman had a shoreline on the Mediterranean Sea.  On land, it bordered the following districts:
Zawiya - east
Jafara - southeast, at a quadripoint
Yafran - south
Nuqat al Khams - west

Notes

Former districts of Libya